The Higher Education Careers Service Unit is an independent research charity based in Manchester for the United Kingdom and Republic of Ireland, specialising in higher education and graduate employment. It funds research projects for the higher education careers sector, and conducts research into graduate employment and career decision-making on behalf of its own members and external funding bodies.

It is a registered charity, formed in 1972, and is an agency of Universities UK and GuildHE. The commercial part of HECSU, CSU, changed its name to Graduate Prospects in July 2003. In 2020 HECSU merged with Jisc.

Its most recognisable function is to produce the Prospects series of booklets with information about graduate careers. Graduate Prospects is the commercial arm of HECSU and provides careers information and services to students, graduates, university careers advisory services, employers and others.

The group produces statistical information on the destination of graduates from particular universities and courses.

The research strategy adopted by HECSU has five themes: 
 Practitioner research
 Labour market information
 Careers guidance
 International comparisons
 Career learning and development

HECSU aims to:
 Improve the dissemination of information about higher education and graduate employment
 Contribute to knowledge of student and graduate career development and employment by conducting and commissioning research
 Work with careers advisers, academic staff, and employers to support graduate employability

Main work includes:
Higher Education Degree Datacheck
Prospects Course Exchange
Graduate Talent Pool
Prospects Luminate

NCWE

See also
 Higher Education Statistics Agency
 List of UK Careers Advisory Services
 Association of Graduate Careers Advisory Services
 ASET (professional body)

References

External links
 Official Site

Educational charities based in the United Kingdom
Graduate recruitment
Higher education organisations based in the United Kingdom
Jisc
Organisations based in Manchester
Organizations established in 1972
University of Manchester